"A Saucer of Loneliness" is the second segment of the twenty-fifth episode, the first episode of the second season (1986–87) of the television series The Twilight Zone. In this segment, a woman receives a message from an extraterrestrial craft and refuses to tell it to anyone. The segment is based on the short story of the same name by Theodore Sturgeon.

Plot
A flying saucer descends from the sky and pursues Margaret, a middle-aged spinster living with her mother and working as a waitress at a diner. It communicates with her telepathically and she passes out. When she awakes, she refuses to reveal what the flying saucer said because it was "a private message". Government authorities capture and examine the saucer but find it empty, and they are unable to identify the composition of its hull.

Margaret is beset by the press, government authorities, and spiritualists all wanting to know what the saucer's message was. Angered by Margaret's continued refusal to reveal it and thereby dispel the public attention, Margaret's mother throws her out of the house. She goes to stay at a hotel. She writes messages in bottles and throws them in the ocean. The next day, a patron at the restaurant asks her out on a date. Excited, Margaret buys a new outfit for the evening and the date is enjoyable for her until he questions her about the saucer's message. Margaret realizes that her date is not interested in her as a person, but only wants to know about the saucer. She ends the date and goes home to cry herself to sleep.

Without hope, Margaret walks along the beach at night and decides to commit suicide. She walks into the ocean, but a man comes and pulls her out. He explains that he found one of her bottles and was touched by the message. She tells him that it was the only thing she could call her own and the only thing she could do for another like herself. Margaret explains that the saucer was an interstellar message in a bottle. Her messages were her own words, an imperfect translation of the saucer's message. She shows the man the actual message, which takes the form of a glowing orb in the palm of her hand. They caress the orb together and it disappears. Margaret and the man walk away together with his arm around her.

Adaptation
The episode differs from the short story it was adapted from. For instance, the loneliness of the woman is obvious from the beginning of the episode, as opposed to the gradual reveal in the short story. The time frame is shorter, too, and the episode adds a resolution with the orb which was not present in the original story.

Production
The episode is dedicated to Theodore Sturgeon, who wrote the short story the episode is based on.

External links
 

The Twilight Zone (1985 TV series season 2) episodes
1986 American television episodes
Television episodes about alien visitations
Television shows based on short fiction
Television episodes written by David Gerrold